A cripple is a person or animal with a physical disability, particularly one who is unable to walk because of an injury or illness. The word was recorded as early as 950 AD, and derives from the Proto-Germanic krupilaz. The German and Dutch words Krüppel and kreupel are cognates.

By the 1970s, the word generally came to be regarded as pejorative when used for people with disabilities. Cripple is also a transitive verb, meaning "cause a disability or inability". The word crippling is also used as an adjective.

Reappropriation 
In the same way that the term "queer" has been reappropriated by the gay rights movement, members of the disability rights movement have reclaimed words such as "cripple", "crip", and "gimp" to refer to themselves. The cripple tribunal in Dortmund on 13 December 1981 was one of the main protest actions of the autonomous German disability movement (in confrontation with the established disability assistance) against human rights abuses in nursing homes and psychiatric hospitals, as well as against deficiencies of local public transport. Analogous to the Russell Tribunal by Amnesty International, the cripple tribunal has denounced human rights violations of disabled people.

Other usages 
 The Crips street gang were so named when members started carrying a cane which gave the impression they were disabled.
 A cripple is a trimmer stud or joist which is shorter than full-length.
 A cripple is a goods wagon or a passenger coach which although safe to run on the railway, is not fit for use and requires a repair before it can be used in service. This could be a coal wagon with a hole in the floor (which would allow coal to fall out of the wagon), or a passenger coach with a broken window.

References 

Pejorative terms for people with disabilities